a.P.A.t.T. (no set pronunciation) is an avant-garde act based in Liverpool, England, who are known for a mixture of musical, filmic and multi-disciplinary works. They perform as a live band as well as avant-garde and modern classical projects.

Among other things, they have performed live soundtracks to accompany films such as Nosferatu.; modern classical pieces such as In C by Terry Riley; and in 2013 they performed the premiere of a piece of music composed from the locations of bird droppings falling on large sheets of paper.

Recordings

Singles and EPs 
 (e.P.) - Self-released  - Digital (2002)
 Fre(e.P.) - Self-released Digital (2005)
 a.P.A.t.T. vs Stig -12" Class A Audio - Vinyl (2008)
 Martins Quest - POSTMUSIC - Digital  (2009)
 Paul the Record 12" - Upset the Rhythm - Digital (2010)
 Just Because - POSTMUSIC - Digital (2014)
Cigarettes & Margarine POSTMUSIC - Digital (2020)
Solipsisim POSTMUSIC - Digital (2021)
The Great Attractor POSTMUSIC - Digital (2022)
It Keeps Going POSTMUSIC - Digital (2023)

Albums 
 (L.P.) - Lowsley Sounds - CD - Digital (2004)
 Black & White Mass - Pickled Egg - CD - Digital (2008)
a.P.A.t.T. / Peepholes (Upset the Rhythm, 2010) – split with Peepholes
 Ogadimma - !aNGRr!, POSTMUSIC - 12" - Digital (2012)
 Fun With Music - Pickled Egg, POSTMUSIC - 12" - Digital (2016)

Compilations 
 Ch(e.a.)P  CD - Digital -(2006)
 Bulk Dump - CD - Digital -(2010)
apattuntiltedmixexclusivthankyoudotcom - Digital (2020)
The Essential Now That's What I Call an a.P.A.t.T. Christmas Vol 1 Digital (2020)

References

External links 

 

English experimental musical groups
Musical groups from Liverpool